This was the first edition of the tournament.

Facundo Bagnis and Ariel Behar won the title after defeating Simone Bolelli and Alessandro Giannessi 6–2, 7–6(9–7) in the final.

Seeds

Draw

References
 Main Draw

Punta Open - Doubles
Punta Open